This is a non-exhaustive world-wide list of government-owned companies. The paragraph that follows was paraphrased from a 1996 GAO report which investigated only the 20th-century American experience. The GAO report did not consider the potential use in the international forum of SOEs as extensions of a nation's foreign policy utensils. A government-owned corporation is a legal entity that undertakes commercial activities on behalf of an owner government. Their legal status varies from being a part of government to stock companies with a state as a regular stockholder. There is no standard definition of a government-owned corporation (GOC) or state-owned enterprise (SOE), although the two terms can be used interchangeably. The defining characteristics are that they have a distinct legal form and that they are established to operate in commercial affairs. While they may also have public policy objectives, GOCs should be differentiated from other forms of government agencies or state entities established to pursue purely non-financial objectives.

Afghanistan 
In 2009, the Government of the Islamic Republic of Afghanistan formed the Afghan Public Protection Force (APPF) as a "state owned enterprise" subordinate to the Ministry of the Interior. By presidential decree, the APPF is mandated to replace all non-diplomatic private security companies by 20 March 2013 to become the sole provider of pay-for-service security contracts within Afghanistan.

Albania 
 Air Albania (51%; 49% Turkish Airlines)
 Albgaz
 KESH
 OSHEE
 Posta Shqiptare
 Radio Televizioni Shqiptar

Algeria 
 Air Algérie
 Anesrif
 Agence algérienne pour le rayonnement culturel
 Agence nationale des autoroutes
 Agence nationale pour la promotion et la rationalisation de l’utilisation de l’énergie
 Algérie Télécom
 Algérie Poste
 Entreprise Métro d’Alger
 Entreprise de transport algérien par câbles
 Entreprise de transport urbain et suburbain d'Alger
 Groupe Cosider
 TRANSTEV
 GCB (entreprise)
 Mobilis
 Naftal
 Office national algérien du tourisme
 Public Establishment of Television (ENTV)
 Radio Algeria (ENRS)
 Sonatrach
 Sonelgaz
 Société nationale des véhicules industriels
 Société nationale de sidérurgie
 Société algérienne des ponts et travaux d'arts
 Société d'exploitation des tramways
 Société d’Exploitation des Gares Routières d’Algérie
 Tassili Airlines

Argentina 

 Administración de Infraestructura Ferroviaria 
 Administración de Recursos Humanos Ferroviarios
 Administración General de Puertos Sociedad del Estado
 Aerolíneas Argentinas
 Aguas y Saneamientos Argentinos
 Astilleros DOMECQ GARCÍA
 Astilleros TANDANOR
 Austral Líneas Aéreas - Cielos del Sur
 Banco de Inversiones y Comercio Exterior
 Banco de la Nación Argentina
 Banco Hipotecario
 Casa de la Moneda 
 Combustibles Nucleares Argentinos CONUARSA
 Compañía Nacional del Mercado Mayorista de Electricidad CAMMESA
 Construcción de Viviendas de la Armada COVIARA
 Contenidos Públicos 
 Corporación del Mercado Central de Buenos Aires
 Corporación Interestadual Pulmarí
 Corporación Puerto Madero
 Corredores Argentinos
 Correo Argentino
 
 
 Emprendimientos Energéticos Binacionales 
 Empresa Argentina de Navegación Aérea
 Empresa de Cargas Aéreas del Atlántico Sud 
 Empresa Neuquina de Ingeniería Nuclear
 Energía Argentina S.A ENARSA 
 Fábrica Argentina de Aviones
 Fabricaciones Militares
 Ferrocarriles Argentinos
 Fondo de Capital Social S.E 
 INTERCARGO S.A.C  
 INTESA
 Investigaciones Aplicadas INVAP S.E 
 Líneas Aéreas del Estado LADE
 Nucleoeléctrica Argentina
 Operadora Ferroviaria 
 Polo Tecnológico Constituyentes
 Radio de la Universidad Nacional del Litoral
 Radio y Televisión Argentina
 Radio y Televisión de la Universidad Nacional de Córdoba
 Soluciones Satelitales Argentinas ARSAT
 Télam
 Yacimientos de Agua de Dionisio
 Yacimientos Carboniferos Río Turbio
 YPF 
 YPF GAS
 YPF Tecnología

Australia 

 Defense Housing Australia
 Australian Rail Track Corporation
 Snowy Hydro 
 Red Energy
 Australian Submarine Corporation
 Australian Broadcasting Corporation
 Special Broadcasting Service
 National Broadband Network
 Western Sydney Airport
 Clean Energy Finance Corporation
 Australia Post

Austria 
 ÖBB (national railway system of Austria, administrator of Liechtenstein's railways)
 ASFINAG (Autobahn and highway financing, building, maintaining and administration)
 Hypo Alpe-Adria-Bank International: Austria nationalised this bank in 2009, and in 2014 its then-Chancellor feared its insolvency might have a similar effect to the Creditanstalt event of 1931.
 Verbund 51% SOE (electricity generator and provider)
 Volksbank 43.3% SOE (retail banking group, with additional operations in Hungary, Romania and Malta) 
 ORF: funded from television licence fee revenue, dominant player in the Austrian broadcast media
 Österreichische Industrieholding (ÖIAG): Austrian industry-holding stock corporation for partially or entirely nationalized companies, as of 2005:
 31.50% of the oil producer OMV: an integrated international oil and gas company
 28.42% of Telekom Austria: fixed line, mobile, data, and Internet communications services
 52.85% of Österreichische Post: postal services
 100% of ÖIAG-Bergbauholding
 100% of Finanzmarkt Beteiligungs AG (FIMBAG)

Azerbaijan 
Azerbaijani Airlines
 Azerenerji
 Azərpoçt
 Azerbaijan Railways
 Azerbaijan Caspian Shipping Company
 Baku Metro
 SOCAR
 AzTV
 Medeniyyet TV
 Idman Azerbaijan TV

Bangladesh 
 Bangladesh Petroleum Corporation
 Bangladesh Submarine Cable Company Limited
 Gas Transmission Company Limited
 Karnaphuli Paper Mills
 Petrobangla
 Biman Bangladesh Airlines
 Bangladesh Bank
 Bangladesh Jute Mills Corporation
 Bangladesh Parjatan Corporation
 Bangladesh Ordnance Factory
 Bangladesh Steel and Engineering Corporation
 Bangladesh Shipping Corporation
 Bangladesh Television  
 Bangladesh Betar
 BCIC
 North-West Power Generation Company Limited
 Ashuganj Power Station Company Limited 
 Electricity Generation Company Bangladesh Limited
 West Zone Power Distribution Company Limited

Belgium 
 Belfius (100%)
 Belgischer Rundfunk
 Bpost
 Brussels Airport (25%)
 Elia System Operator (5.37%)
  (25%)
 - (SFPI-FPIM)
 Fluxys (2.1%)
 Infrabel
 National Railway Company of Belgium
 Proximus (53.3%)
 RTBF
 Vlaamse Radio- en Televisieomroeporganisatie

The Region of Wallonia owns:
 Brussels South Charleroi Airport
 Liège Airport

Belize 
 National Bank of Belize

Bolivia 

 Agencia Boliviana Espacial
 Corporación Minera de Bolivia and subsidiaries
 Corporación de las Fuerzas Armadas para el Desarrollo Nacional and most subsidiaries
 Empresa Boliviana de Alimentos y Derivados
 Empresa Boliviana de Industrialización de Hidrocarburos
 Empresa de Apoyo a la Producción de Alimentos
 Empresa Estatal de Televisión Bolivia TV
 Empresa Estratégica Boliviana de Construcción y Conservación de Infraestructura Civil
 Empresa Estratégica de Producción de Abonos y Fertilizantes
 Empresa Estratégica de Producción de Semillas
 Empresa Nacional de Electricidad (central)
 Empresa Pública Nacional Estratégica Boliviana de Aviación
 Empresa Pública Nacional Estratégica Depositos Aduaneros Bolivianos
 Empresa Pública Nacional Estratégica Yacimientos de Litio Bolivianos
 Empresa Pública Productiva Cartones de Bolivia
 Empresa Pública Productiva Cementos de Bolivia
 Empresa Pública Productiva Envases de Vidrio de Bolivia
 Empresa Pública Productiva Papeles de Bolivia
 Transportes Aéreos Bolivianos
 Yacimientos Petroliferos Fiscales Bolivianos

Brazil 

State-owned enterprises are divided into public enterprises (empresa pública) and mixed-economy companies (sociedade de economia mista). The public enterprises are subdivided into two categories: individual – with its own assets and capital owned by the Union – and plural companies – whose assets are owned by multiple government agencies and the Union, which have the majority of the voting interest. Caixa Econômica Federal, Correios, Embrapa, BNDES and USP are examples of public enterprises. Mixed-economy companies are enterprises with the majority of stocks owned by the government, but that also have stocks owned by the private sector and usually have their shares traded on stock exchanges. Banco do Brasil, Petrobras, Sabesp, and Eletrobras are examples of mixed-economy companies.

Beginning in the 1990s, the central government of Brazil launched a privatization program inspired by the Washington Consensus. State-owned enterprises such as Vale do Rio Doce, Telebrás, CSN, and Usiminas (most of them mixed-economy companies) were transferred to the private sector as part of this policy.

Brazil State Owned Companies Fact Sheet / Download from the planejamento.gov.br website.

Brunei 
 Brunei Investment Agency
 Radio Television Brunei

Bulgaria 
 Bulgarian Energy Holding
 Bulgarian Posts
 Bulgarian State Railways
 LB Bulgaricum
 National Railway Infrastructure Company
 Kintex
 Sofia Airport
 Plovdiv Airport
 Port of Varna EАD
 Port Burgas EАD
 Bulgarian Maritime Training Centre
 Bulgarian National Television

Canada 

In Canada, state-owned corporations are referred to as Crown corporations, indicating that an organization is established by law, owned by the sovereign (either in right of Canada or a province), and overseen by parliament and cabinet. Examples of federal Crown corporations include:
 the Canadian Broadcasting Corporation
 Canada Post
 Bank of Canada
 Telefilm Canada
 Via Rail

Ministers of the Crown often control the shares in such public corporations, while parliament both sets out the laws that create and bind Crown corporations and sets their annual budgets.

Foreign SOEs are welcome to invest in Canada: in fall 2013, British Columbia and Alberta signed agreements overseas to promote foreign direct investment in Canada. The Investment Canada Act governs this area federally. Former Prime Minister Stephen Harper stated in 2013 that the "government [needs] to exercise its judgement" over SOEs.

Crown corporations of British Columbia include:
 BC Hydro
 BC Transit
 BC Housing Management Commission
 British Columbia Lottery Corporation
 Liquor Distribution Branch

Saskatchewan has maintained the largest number of Crown corporations, including:
 Saskatchewan Government Insurance
 SaskEnergy
 SaskPower
 SaskTel
 SaskWater

In Ontario:
 GroupeMédia TFO
 Independent Electricity System Operator
 Ontario Educational Communications Authority
 Ontario Lottery and Gaming Corporation
 Ontario Power Generation
 Liquor Control Board of Ontario

In Quebec:
 Caisse de dépôt et placement du Québec
 Hydro-Québec
 Investissement Québec
 Loto-Québec
 Société de la Place des Arts de Montréal
 Société des alcools du Québec
 Société des Traversiers du Québec
 Société Québécoise des Infrastructures
 Télé-Québec

Privatization, or the selling of Crown corporations to private interests, has become common throughout Canada over the past 30 years. Petro-Canada, Canadian National Railway, and Air Canada are examples of former federal Crown corporations that have been privatized. Privatized provincial Crown corporations include Alberta Government Telephones (which merged with privately owned BC Tel to form Telus), BCRIC, Manitoba Telecom Services, Saskatchewan Oil & Gas Corporation and Potash Corporation of Saskatchewan.

Chile 
 ASMAR
 BancoEstado
 Casa de Moneda de Chile
 Cimm (Centro de Investigación Minera y Metalúrgica)
 Cimm Tecnologías y Servicios S.A.
 Comercializadora de Trigo S.A.
 Codelco (Corporación Nacional del Cobre de Chile)
 Econssa Chile S.A.
 CorreosChile
 EFE
 Empresa de Servicios Sanitarios Lago Peñuelas S.A.
 Metro S.A.
 ENAER
 Enami (Empresa Nacional de Minería)
 Empresa Nacional del Petróleo
 Empresa Portuaria Antofagasta
 Empresa Portuaria Arica
 Empresa Portuaria Austral
 Empresa Portuaria Chacabuco
 Empresa Portuaria Coquimbo
 Empresa Portuaria Iquique
 Empresa Portuaria Puerto Montt
 Empresa Portuaria San Antonio
 Empresa Portuaria Talcahuano San Vicente
 Empresa Portuaria Valparaíso
 FAMAE
 Polla Chilena de Beneficencia S.A.
 Puerto Madero Impresores S.A.
 Sociedad Agrícola Sacor Ltda.
 Sasipa (Sociedad Agrícola y Servicios Isla de Pascua Ltda.)
 Televisión Nacional de Chile
 Zofri

China 

After 1949, all business entities in the People's Republic of China were created and owned by the government. In the late 1980s, the government began to reform the state-owned enterprise, and during the 1990s and 2000s, many mid-sized and small sized state-owned enterprises were privatized and went public. There are a number of different corporate forms which result in a mixture of public and private capital. In PRC terminology, a state-owned enterprise refers to a particular corporate form, which is increasingly being replaced by the listed company. Some of the largest state-owned enterprises have been floated on the Shanghai Stock Exchange and the Shenzhen Stock Exchange, but in actuality, the state maintains total control of these corporations, always holding majority interest and voting rights. State-owned enterprises are mostly governed by both local governments' SASAC and, in the central government, the State-owned Assets Supervision and Administration Commission (SASAC) of the State Council. However, some state-owned enterprise were governed by China Investment Corporation (and its domestic arm Central Huijin Investment), as well as under the governance of Ministry of Education for the university-run enterprises, or some financial institutes that were under the governance of the Ministry of Finance.

As of 2011, 35% of business activity and 43% of profits in the People's Republic of China resulted from companies in which the state owned a majority interest. Critics, such as The New York Times, have alleged that China's state-owned companies are a vehicle for corruption by the families of ruling party leaders who have sometimes amassed fortunes while managing them.

 China had more than 350 individual entries in the Government-owned companies of China category page.

Hong Kong 
In the postwar years, Hong Kong's colonial government operated under a laissez-faire economic philosophy called positive non-interventionism. Hence Crown corporations did not play as significant a role in the development of the territory as in many other British territories.

The MTR Corporation (MTR) was formed as a Crown corporation, mandated to operate under "prudent commercial principles", in 1975. The Kowloon-Canton Railway, operated under a government department, was corporatised in 1982 to imitate the success of MTR (see Kowloon-Canton Railway Corporation). MTR was privatised in 2000 although the Hong Kong Government is still the majority shareholder. KCR was operationally merged with MTR in 2007.

Examples of present-day statutory bodies include the Airport Authority, responsible for running the Hong Kong International Airport, or the Housing Authority, which provides housing to about half of Hong Kong residents.

Colombia 

 Ecopetrol
 Empresas Públicas de Medellín
 ETB
 Las Ceibas - Empresas Públicas de Neiva E.S.P
 INDUMIL
 COTECMAR
 RTVC Sistema de Medios Públicos

Cuba 
 Empresa de Telecomunicaciones de Cuba S.A.
 Union de Industrias Militares
 Cuban Institute of Radio and Television

Czech Republic 

 Budweiser Budvar Brewery
 ČEPS, a.s.
 ČEZ Group
 České dráhy
 Czech Radio
 Česká televize

Denmark 
 Banedanmark
 Danske Spil
 DR
 DSB
 Energinet.dk
 Ørsted (50.1%)
 PostNord Danmark 

Municipal
 Aarhus Vand A/S
 Kalundborg Forsyning A/S
 Middelgrunden offshore electricity generation wind farm
 Samsø offshore electricity generation wind farm and district heating plants
 Vandcenter Syd as

Ecuador 
 Ecuadorian Naval Shipyards ASTINAVE EP
 Banking for Rural and Urban Productive Development BANECUADOR BP
 Development Bank of Ecuador BDE
 Pacific Bank BDP (currently on sale)
 Electricity Corporation of Ecuador CELEC EP
 National Electricity Corporation CNEL EP
 National Telecommunications Corporation CNT EP (currently on sale)
 Ecuadorian Railways (defunct)
 Post Office of Ecuador CDE
 EMELNORTE SA
 Regional Electric Company Ambato Centro Norte SA EEASA
 Electric Company Azogues CA EEA
 Electric Company CENTROSUR
 Electric Company Provincial Cotopaxi SA EEPC
 Galápagos Provincial Electric Company EEPG
 Quito Electric Company EEQ
 Southern Regional Electric Company SA EERSSA
 Riobamba Electric Company SA EERSA
 National Mining Company ENAMI
 Public Water Company EPA
 Public Media EPMPCE (many medias are behind this entity such as TC Television, Gamavision, Ecuadorian Public Radio and Ecuador TV)
 Ecuadorian Petroleum Fleet Public Company FLOPEC
 PETROECUADOR EP
 Ecuador Airline TAME EP (defunct)
 PETROAMAZONAS EP
 Santa Barbara EP SBEP
 Ecuadorian Shipping Transport TRANSNAVE
 Storage Unit UAE

Egypt 
 Egypt Post
 EgyptAir
 Egyptian National Railways
 Nile TV
 Suez Canal Authority
 Telecom Egypt
 EGPC
 ERTU
 EGAS
 Arab Contractors
 National Bank of Egypt
 Banque Misr
 Banque du Caire

Finland 

 Alko
 Altia
 CSC – IT Center for Science
 Destia
 Hansel Ltd.
 Laatumaa
 Metsähallitus
 National Land Survey of Finland
 Omaisuudenhoitoyhtiö Arsenal
 Patria
 Senate Properties
 Veikkaus
 VR Group
 Yle

France

Gabon 
 Société Nationale Petrolière Gabonaise

Germany

Ghana 
 Ghana National Petroleum Corporation
 Ghana Oil Company
 Volta River Authority
 Electricity Company of Ghana
Cocoa Processing Company Limited
 Ghana Water Company Limited

Greenland 
 Greenland Airport Authority

Hungary 

 Hungarian State Railways
 Kossuth Rádió
 Magyar Posta
 Magyar Rádió
 Magyar Televízió
 MVM Group
 Paks Nuclear Power Plant
 State Printing Company

India 

In India, state-owned enterprise is termed a Public Sector Undertaking (PSU) or a Central Public Sector Enterprise (CPSE). These companies are owned by the Union Government, or one of the many state or territorial governments, or both. The company equity needs to be majority owned by the government to be a PSU. Examples are Life Insurance Corporation of India, Oil and Natural Gas Corporation, Engineers India Limited, India Trade Promotion Organization, GAIL, BSNL, Food Corporation of India, Air India, and Bharat Heavy Electrials Limited (BHEL).

Indonesia

Iran 
 Iran Air
 National Iranian Gas Company
 Islamic Republic of Iran Broadcasting

Iraq 

 General Company for Ports of Iraq
 Iraq National Oil Company
 Iraqi Airways
 Iraqi Post
 Iraqi Republic Railways
 Iraqi Telecommunications and Post Company

Ireland 

 Bank of Ireland (15%)

Israel 

 Amidar
 Israel Aerospace Industries
 Israel Aerospace Industries Tamam Division
 Israel Airports Authority
 Israel Broadcasting Authority (including Israel Radio)
 Israeli Public Broadcasting Corporation
 Israel Electric Corporation
 Israel Port Authority
 Israel Postal Company
 Israel Railways
 Mekorot
 National Roads Company of Israel
 Rafael Advanced Defense Systems

Italy 
Companies owned by the Ministry of Economy and Finances:

 Alitalia - Linee Aeree Italiane S.p.A. in a.s. (49,90%)
 ANAS S.p.A. (100%)
 ARCUS S.p.A. (100%)
 Cassa Depositi e Prestiti S.p.A. (70%)
 Fintecna S.p.A. (100%)
 CDP Reti
 Cinecittà Luce S.p.A. (100%)
 Coni Servizi S.p.A. (100%)
 Consap S.p.A. (100%)
 Consip S.p.A. (100%)
 Expo 2015 S.p.A. (40%)
 ENAV S.p.A. (100%)
 Enel S.p.A. (31,24%)
 Eni S.p.A. (3,93%) (Cassa Depositi e Prestiti S.p.A. holds 26,40%)
 Leonardo S.p.A. (30,20%)
 Invitalia S.p.A. (100%)
 EUR S.p.A. (90%)
 Ferrovie dello Stato Italiane S.p.A. (100%)
 Fondo Italiano d'Investimento SGR S.p.A. (12,50%)
 GSE S.p.A. (100%)
 Istituto Poligrafico e Zecca dello Stato S.p.A. (100%)
 Italia Lavoro S.p.A. (100%)
 Poste Italiane S.p.A. (64.696%)
 Rai Radiotelevisione Italiana S.p.A. (99,56%)
 Rete Autostrade Mediterranee S.p.A. (100%)
 SACE S.p.A. (100%)
 Sicot S.r.l. (100%)
 Società per lo Sviluppo del Mercato dei Fondi Pensione S.p.A. (56,01%)
 SOGEI S.p.A. (100%)
 SOGESID S.p.A. (100%)
 SOGIN S.p.A. (100%)
 STMicroelectronics Holding N.V. (50%)
 Studiare Sviluppo S.r.l. (100%)

Japan 

Tokushu hōjin are the Japanese equivalent to statutory corporations; tokushu gaisha are kabushiki gaisha owned wholly or majorly by the government.

Japan Post was reorganized into Japan Post Group in 2007 as a material step of the postal privatization. It ceased to be wholly owned by the government on November 4, 2015 when the government listed 11% of its holdings on the Tokyo Stock Exchange. Parts of the Japan Railways Group (JR) were formerly owned by the government. The Electric Power Development Co., Limited was also state-owned before being privatized.

Tokushu hōjin 
 NHK
 Japan Racing Association
 Japan Pension Service
 Okinawa Development Finance Corporation
 Promotion and Mutual Service Corporation for Private Schools of Japan

Tokushu gaisha 
 Japan Railways Group
Hokkaido Railway Company
 Shikoku Railway Company
 Japan Freight Railway Company
 Expressways of Japan
 East Nippon Expressway Company Limited (100%)
 Central Nippon Expressway Company Limited (100%)
 West Nippon Expressway Company Limited (100%)
 Metropolitan Expressway Company Limited (49.99%)
 Hanshin Expressway Company Limited (50%)
 Honshu-Shikoku Bridge Expressway Company Limited (JB Honshi Kōsoku) (66.63%)
 Japan Alcohol (J.alco) (33.3%; the rest are owned by Japan Alcohol Trading Company/Nihon Alcohol Hanbai KK, a private company)
 Narita International Airport Corporation (MLIT 90.01%, MOF 9.99%)
 Nippon Automated Cargo Clearance Systems (NACCS) (50.01%)
 Tokyo Metro Company, Limited (53.42%)
 The government is mandated by law to own one-thirds of all Nippon Telegraph and Telephone, Japan Tobacco, and Japan Post Holdings Company stocks
 Owned by JOGMEC:
 JAPEX (34%)
 Inpex (18.96%)

Kazakhstan 
 KazMunayGas
 Qazaqstan Radio and Television Corporation

Kenya 

Parastatals in Kenya, partly from a lack of expertise and endemic corruption, have largely inhibited economic development. In 1979, a presidential commission went as far as saying that they constituted "a serious threat to the economy", and, by 1989, they had still not furthered industrialization or fostered the development of a Black business class.

Several Kenyan SOEs have been privatized since the 1980s, with mixed results.

 Kenya Broadcasting Corporation
 Kenya Electricity Generating Company
 Kenya Pipeline Company
 Kenya Railways Corporation
 National Oil Corporation of Kenya

Kuwait 
 Kuwait Petroleum Corporation
 Kuwait Television

South Korea 
There are many state-owned enterprises in South Korea.
 Educational Broadcasting System
 Incheon International Airport
 Korail
 Korea Electric Power Corporation
 Korea Land and Housing Corporation
 Korea National Oil Corporation
 Korean Broadcasting System
 Seoul Metro
 Seoul Metropolitan Rapid Transit Corporation

Latvia 
 VAS Latvijas Pasts - 100% owned by the Ministry of Transport
AS Latvian State Forests (Latvijas Valsts meži) - 100% owned by the Ministry of Agriculture
VAS Latvian Railways (Latvijas dzelzceļš) - 100% owned by the Ministry of Transport
AS Latvenergo - 100% owned by the Ministry of Economics
VSIA Latvian Television
VSIA Latvian Radio
AS Air Baltic Corporation - 80.05% owned by the Ministry of Transport
VSIA Latvian National Opera and Ballet
VSIA Pauls Stradiņš Clinical University Hospital
VSIA Latvian National Theatre
VSIA Latvijas Vēstnesis - 100% owned by the Ministry of Justice
VSIA Latvian Environment, Geology and Meteorology Centre

Libya 
 Libyan Jamahiriya Broadcasting Corporation
 National Oil Corporation

Lithuania 
 Lietuvos paštas
 Lithuanian Mint
 Lithuanian National Radio and Television
 Lithuanian Railways

Luxembourg 

 Banque et Caisse d'Épargne de l'État
 Central Bank of Luxembourg
 Centre Hospitalier de Luxembourg
 Post Luxembourg
 Société Nationale de Crédit et d'Investissement
 Société Nationale des Chemins de Fer Luxembourgeois

Madagascar 
 Air Madagascar
 Jirama
 Télévision Malagasy

Malaysia 

  1Malaysia Development Berhad
  Agro Bank Malaysia
  Bank Simpanan Nasional
  Indah Water Konsortium
  Jaring
 Keretapi Tanah Melayu
  Khazanah Nasional
  Malaysia Airlines
  MASwings
  MRT Corp
  Perwaja Steel
  Petronas
  Petronas Methanol
  Pos Malaysia
  Prasarana Malaysia
  Radio Televisyen Malaysia
  Rapid Penang
  Sabah Electricity
  Sarawak Media Group
  Sirim
  Telekom Malaysia
  Tenaga Nasional
  Katadi Malaysia Berhad

Mauritius 
 Mauritius Broadcasting Corporation

Mexico 

 Aeropuertos y Servicios Auxiliares
 Comisión Federal de Electricidad
 Concarril
 Ferrocarril Transístmico
 MASA
 Pemex
 Aeroméxico
 Ferrocarriles Chiapas-Mayab
 Sistema Público de Radiodifusión del Estado Mexicano

Namibia 
 Bank of Namibia
 NamWater
 Otavi Mining and Railway Company
 TransNamib
 Namibian Broadcasting Corporation

Netherlands 

 Gasunie
 Holland Casino
 Nederlandse Spoorwegen
 NS Railinfratrust
 Royal Dutch Mint
 SNS Reaal
 TenneT
 Nederlandse Publieke Omroep (organization)
 KLM

New Zealand 

New Zealanders commonly refer to their state-owned enterprises as "SOEs", or as "crown entities". Local government councils and similar authorities also set up locally controlled enterprises, such as water-supply companies and "local-authority trading enterprises" (LATEs) as separate corporations or as business units of the councils concerned.

Government-owned businesses designated as crown entities include:
 Television New Zealand
 Radio New Zealand
 Crown Research Institutes

New Zealand's state-owned enterprises have included:
 New Zealand Post
 Kiwibank
 Meteorological Service of New Zealand Limited
 Airways New Zealand
 Transpower New Zealand Limited
 Landcorp
 Kordia
 Orcon Internet Limited (2007-2013)
 Mercury Energy
 Meridian Energy
 Genesis Energy Limited
 Learning Media Limited
 Solid Energy

State-owned enterprises which have undergone privatisation and subsequent renationalisation:
 New Zealand Railways Corporation
 KiwiRail
 Air New Zealand
 Quotable Value (QV - partially privatised)

Nigeria 
 Garden City Radio 89.9
 Nigeria Social Insurance Trust Fund
 Nigerian Coal Corporation
 Nigerian National Petroleum Corporation
 Power Holding Company of Nigerianow privatize 
 Nigeria Ports Authority
 Nigeria Broadcasting Corporation
 Nigeria Railway Corporation
Nigeria Television Authority(NTA)
National Aviation Handling Company(NACHO)

North Korea

Norway

Oman 
 Oman Air

Pakistan 

Pakistan has a large list of government owned companies called State owned entities (SOEs). These played an important role in the development of the business and industry in Pakistan, but recently they are considered responsible for fiscal difficulties of the government due to corruption and bad governance. These SOEs, roughly 190 in number, operate in a wide range of economic areas including energy, communication, transport, shipping, trading, and banking & finance. Some of the most common examples of crown companies in Pakistan are Pakistan State Oil, Sui Norther Gas Pipelines, Pakistan International Airlines, and Pakistan Steel Mills.

Panama 
 Panama Canal

Philippines 

In the Philippines, state-owned enterprises are known as government-owned and controlled corporations (GOCCs). They can range from the Social Security System (SSS) and the Philippine Coconut Authority with no counterparts in the private sector, to Land Bank of the Philippines, a wholly government-owned bank that competes with private banks. A number of GOCCs, especially those that were nationalized by president Ferdinand Marcos during his time as the leader of the Fourth Republic of the Philippines, were returned to the private sector by the end of the 20th and the beginning of the 21st century, as with Philippine Airlines (PAL), Philippine Long Distance Telephone Company (PLDT), Philippine National Bank (PNB), and ABS-CBN Corporation (where the frequencies and facilities used by Banahaw Broadcasting Corporation (BBC) were returned to ABS-CBN in 1986 and the ABS-CBN Broadcasting Center were fully recovered by ABS-CBN from People's Television Network (PTV) in 1992), or fully or partially privatized as with National Power Corporation (NPC/NAPOCOR), National Transmission Corporation (TransCo), and Philippine National Construction Corporation (PNCC).

Poland 

 Grupa Lotos
 Huta Stalowa Wola
 KGHM Polska Miedź
 LOT Polish Airlines
 Nofer Institute of Occupational Medicine
 PGNiG
 PKN Orlen
 PKO Bank Polski
 PKP Group
 Polska Grupa Energetyczna
 Powszechny Zakład Ubezpieczeń
 Przedsiębiorstwo Komunikacji Samochodowej
 Tauron Group
 Warsaw Stock Exchange
 Zakłady Azotowe Kędzierzyn
 Zakłady Azotowe Puławy
 Telewizja Polska

Portugal 

 Águas de Portugal: (100%) water supplier and wastewater sanitation manager
 IP: (100%) construction and management of railway and road infrastructure
 CP: (100%) rail transport operator
 NAV Portugal: (100%) air navigation service provider
 idD Portugal Defence: (100%) state-owned holding, specialized in defense and development of technological systems
 RTP: (100%) public service broadcasting
 INCM: (100%) national mint and print office
 Transtejo & Soflusa: (100%) ferry operator in the city of Lisbon
 Metropolitano de Lisboa: (100%) rapid transit system in the city of Lisbon
 Metro do Porto: light rail transit system in the city of Porto
 Metro Mondego: (100%) bus rapid transit system in the city of Coimbra
 BPF: (100%) investment financial institution
 CGD: (100%) finance institution and banking corporation
 TAP Portugal: (100%) flag carrier airline

Puerto Rico

Romania 
 Căile Ferate Române
 Compania Nationala a Uraniului S.A. (100%)
 Complexul Energetic Hunedoara S.A. (100%)
 Complexul Energetic Oltenia S.A. (77.15%)
 Conpet S.A. (58.72%)
 Hidroelectrica (80%)
 Loteria Română
 Metrorex
 National Company "Bucharest Airports" S.A. (Henri Coandă International Airport & Aurel Vlaicu International Airport)
 Nuclearelectrica (82.5%)
 Oil Terminal S.A. (59.62%)
 Poșta Română (75%)
 Romgaz S.A. (70.01%)
 Romsilva
 S.N. de Inchideri Mine Valea Jiului S.A. (100%)
 Societatea de Administrare a Participatiilor in Energie S.A. (100%)
 Societatea Nationala de Radiocomunicatii
 TAROM
 Transelectrica
 Transgaz
 Uzina Termoelectrica Midia S.A. (56.58%)

The state of Romania owns a minority stake in:
 Electrica (48.78%)
 Engie Romania S.A. (37%)
 E.ON Energie Romania S.A. (31.82%)
 E.ON Distributie Romania S.A. (13.51%)
 OMV Petrom S.A. (20.64%)
 Rompetrol Rafinare S.A. (44.7%)
 Telekom Romania (45,99%)
 Romanian Television

Russia

Saudi Arabia 
 MAADEN
 NADEC
 SABIC
 Saudi Aramco
 Saudia
 SWCC
 Thiqah Business Services
 Saudi Broadcasting Authority

Serbia 

 Air Serbia (51% share)
 Elektroprivreda Srbije
 HIP Petrohemija
 Plovput
 Pošta Srbije
 RB Kolubara
 Serbian Railways
 Srbijagas
 Tanjug
 Telekom Srbija
 Yugoimport SDPR
 Zastava Arms
 Radio Television of Serbia

Seychelles 
 Seychelles Marketing Board

Singapore 
Government-linked corporations play a substantial role in Singapore's domestic economy. These GLCs are partially or fully owned by a state-owned investment company, Temasek Holdings. As of November 2011, the top six Singapore-listed GLCs accounted for about 17% of total capitalization of the Singapore Exchange (SGX). Notable GLCs include Singapore Airlines, SingTel, ST Engineering, and Mediacorp.

 CapitaLand
 GIC Private Limited
 Mediacorp
 PSA International
 Singapore Airlines
 Singapore Pools
 Singapore Post
 Singapore Power
 SingTel
 SMRT Corporation
 ST Engineering
 Temasek Holdings

Slovakia 
 Kremnica Mint
 Radio and Television of Slovakia

Slovenia 
Slovenia is an ex-Yugoslavian republic.  As such, its economy was largely state-owned prior to dissolution of that federation.  The state still owns many enterprises, such as the banks, which in turn own such businesses as supermarkets and newspapers.

 Abanka, third largest bank
 Nova KBM, second largest bank
 Nova Ljubljanska banka, largest bank
 Radiotelevizija Slovenija

South Africa

Spain 
Spain has thousands of public companies owned by the central, regional and local administrations. This is a short list of some of the most relevant at national level:

 ADIF: (100%) construction and management of rail infrastructure
 Renfe Operadora: (100%) rail transport
 ENAIRE: (100%) state-owned holding, specialized in the commercial aviation sector; owner of the air navigation service provider and of 51% of AENA
 Aena: (51% state-owned, 49% is being privatized): airport management
 Navantia: (100%) shipbuilding
 RTVE (100%) radio and television broadcasting
 Correos: (100%) postal services, courier
 Enagas: (5%) gas transmission network operator 
 Indra Sistemas: (25%) technology systems developer 
 Red Electrica de España: (20%) transmission network operator
 Loterías y Apuestas del Estado: (100%) lottery
 CaixaBank: (16%) banking
 Airbus 4% (28% total with Germany and France)

Sri Lanka

Sweden 

There are two types. Government-owned companies are legally normal companies but mainly or fully national owned. They are expected to be funded by their sales. A big customer might be the government or a government agency. The other type is government agencies which might also do activities competing with private owned companies. They usually are funded by tax money but can also sell services. The government has tried to avoid having agencies doing commercial activities, by separating out areas that compete with private companies into government-owned companies, for example within road construction. The reason is both to avoid unfair competition, and a wish to have market economy instead of plan economy as much as possible. Based on the tradition of avoiding "ministerial rule", the government has avoided interfering with the business of the companies, and allowed them to go international.

Switzerland 

  Eidgenoessische Konstruktionswerkstaette
  Hotel Bellevue Palace
  RUAG
  Skyguide
  Swiss Federal Railways
  Swiss National Bank
  Swiss Post
  Swisscom
  Verkehrsbetriebe Glattal
 Swiss Broadcasting Corporation

Syria 

 Commercial Bank of Syria
 Syrian Air
 Syrian Petroleum Company
 Syrian Railways
 Syrian Telecom
 Syrian-Qatari Holding Company
 Syria TV
 Syrian News Channel
 Syrian Drama TV

Taiwan

Tanzania 
The Government of Tanzania owns a number of commercial enterprises in the country via the Treasury Registrar. It wholly owns the following corporations unless indicated otherwise:
 Air Tanzania
 Arusha International Conference Centre
 Marine Services Company Limited
 Tanzania Electric Supply Company Limited
 Tanzania Railways Limited
 Tanzania Telecommunications Company Limited (65%)
 TAZARA Railway (50%)
 Tanzanian and Italian Petroleum Refining Company Limited (50%)

Thailand

Trinidad and Tobago 

 Caribbean Airlines
 Lake Asphalt of Trinidad and Tobago
 National Infrastructure Development Company
 Public Transport Service Corporation
 Telecommunications Services of Trinidad and Tobago
 TTPost
 UDeCOTT

Tunisia 
 Compagnie Tunisienne de Navigation
 Entreprise Tunisienne d'Activités Pétrolières
 La Poste Tunisienne
 Tunisian Railways
 Établissement de la radiodiffusion-télévision tunisienne
 Radio Tunisienne
 Télévision Tunisienne

Turkey 

 AnadoluJet
 Aselsan
 DDY/TCDD/Turkish State Railways
 HAVELSAN
 Mechanical and Chemical Industry Corporation
 THY/Turkish Airlines
 Turkish Aerospace Industries
 Türksat
 Halkbank
 Halk Katılım
 VakıfBank
 Vakıf Katılım
 Ziraat Bank
 Ziraat Katılım
 Turkish Radio and Television Corporation

United Arab Emirates

United Kingdom

United States

Uruguay

Venezuela 

  Agropatria
  Alcasa
  Banco Bicentenario
  Banco de Venezuela
  Banco del Tesoro
  CANTV
  Citgo
  Corporación Venezolana de Guayana
  Corpoelec
  Pequiven
 Ferrominera del Orinoco
  Mission Mercal
  Monte Ávila Editores
  PDVAL
  PDVSA
  SIDOR
 Venalum
  VIT, C.A.
  Ciudad CCS
  Correo del Orinoco
 Diario Vea
  TeleSUR
  Colombeia
  TVes
  Venezolana de Televisión
  ViVe

Vietnam 

 Airports Corporation of Vietnam
 Bank for Investment and Development of Vietnam
 Petrolimex
 Petrovietnam
 State Capital Investment Corporation
 Vietnam Airlines
 Vietnam Air Services Company
 Vietnam Electricity
 Vietnam Multimedia Corporation
 Vietnam Posts and Telecommunications Group
 Viettel Mobile
 Vietnam Railways
 Vietnam Television
 Vinacomin
 Vinatex

Zambia 
 TAZARA Railway
 Zambia Airports Corporation Limited
 ZESCO
 Zambia National Broadcasting Corporation

Zimbabwe 
 ZimPost
 Zimbabwe Broadcasting Corporation

See also

 Government-owned companies by country (category)
 List of government-owned airlines
 List of privatizations
 Lists of companies (category)
 National oil company
 State ownership

References

Bibliography
 .  Alternate location:

External links
 

Lists of companies